Cumbernauld, Kilsyth and Kirkintilloch East is a constituency of the House of Commons of the Parliament of the United Kingdom. It was created for the 2005 general election, replacing Cumbernauld and Kilsyth and part of Strathkelvin and Bearsden.

The constituency covers the north of the North Lanarkshire council area, and small eastern and northern part of the East Dunbartonshire council area.  It is currently represented by Stuart McDonald of the Scottish National Party, who overturned a Labour majority of nearly 14,000 to take 59.9% of the vote in the May 2015 general election.

With 38 letters (plus one comma and four spaces), Cumbernauld, Kilsyth and Kirkintilloch East has the longest constituency name in the current Parliament.

Boundaries 

This constituency brings together areas from North Lanarkshire and East Dunbartonshire councils. The western, mostly rural, areas including Lennoxtown, Milton of Campsie, Twechar and the Campsie hills are joined in the east and south by the eastern wards from Kirkintilloch and the entire towns of Cumbernauld and Kilsyth. These two latter areas formed one constituency prior to the 2000 review.

The new town of Cumbernauld is approximately 15 miles north-east of Glasgow.

The electoral divisions used in this constituency are:

In full: Cumbernauld East, Cumbernauld North, Cumbernauld South, Kilsyth
In part: Bishopbriggs North and Campsie, Kirkintilloch East and North and Twechar, Lenzie and Kirkintilloch South.

Members of Parliament

Election results

Elections in the 2010s

Elections in the 2000s

References 

Westminster Parliamentary constituencies in Scotland
Constituencies of the Parliament of the United Kingdom established in 2005
Kirkintilloch
Politics of North Lanarkshire
Politics of East Dunbartonshire